Offstage Theatre produces site-specific one-acts and short plays and stages them in the locations—bars, museums, shops—for which they were written. Founded in Charlottesville, VA in 1988-89 by Doug Grissom, associate professor and Head of Playwriting at University of Virginia, playwrights Mark Serrill and Tom Coash, with John Quinn as its first Resident Director, the company remains committed primarily to producing new work in non-theatrical spaces, with a few exceptions.

In 1993, then-Artistic Director John Quinn began producing Offstage's plays in Boston and Cambridge, Massachusetts, and at the Edinburgh Fringe Festival. Joel Jones took Offstage to NYC in 2005. Offstage is most well known for its Barhoppers series performed in Charlottesville area restaurants, its Pub Crawl in Boston/Cambridge area pubs, and an educational touring program ("But I Said No") addressing acquaintance rape that has received national acclaim.

Playwrights, directors and performers
Offstage has performed several world premieres, and draws heavily, though not exclusively from local Virginia and University of Virginia playwrighting talents, including works from Edward Albee, Margaret Baldwin, Samuel Beckett, Eric Bogosian, Tom Coash, Lila Fenton Heasley, Matthew Farrell, Tina Fey, Scott Fishel, Doug Grissom, Elizabeth Harris, David Ives, Joel Jones, Franz Xaver Kroetz, Sandy McAdams, Aidan Parkinson, John Quinn, Laura Quinn, William Rough, Mark Serrill, Aaron Sorkin, Barney Strauss, Jr., Lucinda McDermott, among others.

Directors have included Tom Coash, Elizabeth Harris, Joel Jones, Cristan Keighley, Chris Patrick, Carol Pedersen, John Quinn, Mark Serrill, Tricia Sexton, Jacquie Patteson, Mendy St. Ours,  Denise Stewart, and Betsy Rudelich Tucker among others.

Notable performers in Offstage Theatre works have included Cate Andrews, Phillip Beard, Bambi Chapin, John Wentworth Chapin, Richard Gilman, Lila Fenton Heasley, Scott Fishel, Ben Jones, Cristan Keighley, Jenifer Marshall, Dave Matthews, Thadd McQuade, Beatrice Ost, Chris Patrick, Brooke Plotnick, Sian Richards, Stuart Ross, William Rough, Pamela Rogers Schnatterly, John Schnatterly, Steve Tharp, Mark Valahovic, Jacquie Patteson, Richard Warner, David Wellbeloved and many others.

Performance history

Production venues

Artistic directors
Tom Coash
Doug Grissom
Mark Serrill 
John Quinn 
Joel Jones
Larry Emmons
Jeff Kitchen
Tim Van Dyck & Denise Stewart (co-artistic directors)
Chris Patrick
Bree Luck

References

Theatres in Virginia
University of Virginia
1989 establishments in Virginia